NEUC may refer to:
 New Era University College, a private university college in Malaysia
 UDP-N-acetylglucosamine 2-epimerase (hydrolysing), an enzyme
 UDP-N,N'-diacetylbacillosamine 2-epimerase (hydrolysing), an enzyme